Barrington River  may refer to:

Barrington River (New South Wales), Australia
Barrington River (Nova Scotia), Canada
Barrington River (Rhode Island), U.S.